Tugaryakovo (Tügäräk) is a rural locality (a village) in Chelkakovsky Selsoviet, Burayevsky District, Bashkortostan, Russia. The population was 106 as of 2010. There are 2 streets.

Geography 
Tugaryakovo is located 29 km southwest of Burayevo (the district's administrative centre) by road. Novoaltybayevo is the nearest rural locality.

References 

Rural localities in Burayevsky District